The Silent Child is a British sign language short film written by and starring Rachel Shenton and directed by Chris Overton, and released in 2017 by Slick Films. It tells the story of Libby, a profoundly deaf 6-year-old girl, who lives a silent life until a social worker, played by Shenton, teaches her how to communicate through sign language. The film won the Oscar for Live Action Short Film at the 90th Academy Awards. The film's television debut was on BBC One to an audience of 3.6 million, the film then received an extended period on BBC iPlayer.

Premise
The film was based on Shenton's own experiences as the child of a parent who became deaf. The film features profoundly deaf six-year-old first-time actor Maisie Sly as the titular child. British Sign Language (BSL) is used in the film.

Plot
Joanne (Rachel Shenton) is a social worker who arrives at Libby's (Maisie Sly) home as Libby's siblings (Sam Rees and Annie Cusselle) and father Paul (Philip York) run out the door. Libby's mother, Sue, (Rachel Fielding) explains that Libby was found deaf at three years old despite having no deaf relatives, and that she can lip-read.
However, the truth is no one makes any effort to communicate with her: though they assume Libby is able to read their lips proficiently, they change topics quickly, speak without facing her, and leave her isolated for long periods of time. Libby's most strained relationship is with her mother, who claims she is too busy for such basic activities as taking her to the park, and whose physical affection Libby rejects.

Taken aback at Libby's lack of familial interaction, and wishing to help the child diversify her forms of communication, Joanne teaches Libby British Sign Language. They take trips to the park and garden, play sardines and eat sweets, all in BSL. Libby, who quickly gains a proficiency of BSL, soon adores Joanne, with whom she can communicate. However, Libby is still unable to communicate at home; though her siblings show appreciation for Joanne's work and Libby's knowledge of BSL, even showing interest in learning the language, Libby's parents flatly refuse to learn, with the excuse that there is no time for the family to participate due to their schedules. Furthermore, Sue shows increasing signs of insecurity at Joanne's close relationship with Libby, and is opposed to Libby learning BSL, believing that Libby's best chance of classroom integration is to continue lip-reading in opposition to Joanne's insistence that her best odds are with a classroom aide and interpreter (a role Joanne volunteers for).

While talking to Paul's mother (Anna Barry), Joanne realizes that Libby was the product of an extramarital affair, and her biological father’s father was deaf, contrary to what Sue had said in their first meeting. The family has low expectations for Libby, despite her being intelligent and active; Paul's mother shows outdated knowledge of deafness and is unsure if Libby will even be able to get a job.

Soon, Sue and Paul fire Joanne, telling her that Libby cannot continue BSL and must return to lip-reading. Despite Joanne's suggestions they are sending her to a normal school, where another deaf boy had been and "did fine". On Libby's first day at school, she cannot understand anything. She stands all day, alone, while the teacher talks as if Libby could hear, and the children play around her. Joanne, upset at being unable to say goodbye to Libby, arrives at her school to find her standing alone at recess. When the little girl spots her, she signs "I love you". Joanne, realizing Libby's future (alone, with no communication and no support), begins to cry before signing "I love you" back, and leaves. The film ends with a PSA that deaf children can succeed in every way a hearing child can, as long as they have the proper support.

Cast
 Rachel Shenton as Joanne, a social worker
 Maisie Sly as Libby, a profoundly deaf 6-year-old girl
 Rachel Fielding as Sue
 Philip York as Paul
 Anna Barry as Nancy
 Sam Rees as Seb
 Annie Cusselle as Pip

Reception

Critical response
The Silent Child has an approval rating of 92% on review aggregator website Rotten Tomatoes, based on 13 reviews, and an average rating of 8.71/10.

Awards and nominations
The Silent Child won best short film at the Rhode Island International Film Festival in August 2017. This made it eligible for entry to the Oscars. In December 2017 the film was selected as one of the final ten films in the Live Action Short Film category for the 90th Academy Awards. On 23 January 2018, it was announced that The Silent Child was nominated for the Academy Award for Best Live Action Short Film for the 90th Academy Awards, which it then won. Shenton kept a promise that she had made to their young lead actress and signed her acceptance speech.

Festivals Selections

See also
 List of films featuring the deaf and hard of hearing

References

External links
 The Silent Child website
 The Silent Child on BBC iPlayer
  
 The Silent Child review in Miro magazine

2017 films
2017 short films
British short films
British Sign Language films
Films about deaf people
Live Action Short Film Academy Award winners
2010s English-language films